Klaus J. Kohler (born 1935 in Karlsruhe) is a German phonetician.

Selected publications 
 Kommunikative Aspekte satzphonetischer Prozesse im Deutschen. In: H. Vater (ed.), Phonologische Probleme des Deutschen. Studien zur deutschen Grammatik 10, 13-39. Tübingen: Gunter Narr (1979).
 Dimensions in the perception of fortis and lenis plosives. Phonetica 36, 332-343 (1979).
 F0 in the production of lenis and fortis plosives. Phonetica 39, 199-218 (1982).
 F0 in the perception of lenis and fortis plosives. JASA 78, 21-32 (1985).
 Invariance and variability in speech timing: from utterance to segment in German. In: J. S. Perkell, D. H. Klatt (eds), Invariance and Variability in Speech Processes, 268-289. Hillsdale, New Jersey: Lawrence Erlbaum (1986).
 Parameters of speech rate perception in German words and sentences: duration, F0 movement, and F0 level. Language and Speech 29, 115-139 (1986).
 Computer synthesis of intonation. Proc. 12th Intern. Congr. Acoustics, Toronto, A6-6 (1986). 
 Categorical pitch perception. Proc. 11th ICPhS, Tallinn, vol. 5, 331-333 (1987). 
 The linguistic functions of F0 peaks. Proc. 11th ICPhS, Tallinn, vol. 3, 149-152 (1987). 
 An intonation model for a German Text-to-speech system. Proc. Speech '88, 7th FASE Symposium, Edinburgh., 1241-1249 (1988). 
 Macro and micro F0 in the synthesis of intonation. In: J. Kingston and M. E. Beckamn (eds), Papers in Laboratory Phonology I, 115-138. Cambridge: CUP (1990). 
 Segmental reduction in connected speech in German: phonological facts and phonetic explanations. In: W. J. Hardcastle, A. Marchal (eds), Speech Production and Speech Modelling, 69-92. Dordrecht: Kluwer Academic Publishers (1990). 
 Form and function of intonation peaks in German; a research project. In: K. J. Kohler, (ed.) Studies in German Intonation. AIPUK 25, 11-27. (1991). 
 Terminal intonation patterns in single-accent utterances of German: phonetics, phonology and semantics. In: K. J. Kohler, (ed.) Studies in German Intonation. AIPUK 25, 115-185. (1991). 
 A model of German intonation. In: K. J. Kohler, (ed.) Studies in German Intonation. AIPUK 25, 295-360. (1991). 
 Glottal stops and glottalization in German. Data and theory of connected speech processes. Phonetica 51, 38-51 (1994).
 Einführung in die Phonetik des Deutschen. Berlin: Erich Schmidt Verlag (2. Aufl. 1995).
 Modelling prosody in spontaneous speech. In: Y. Sagisaka, N. Campbell, N. Higuchi (eds), Computing Prosody. Computational models for processing spontaneous speech. 187-210. New York: Springer (1997). 
 Parametric control of prosodic variables by symbolic input in TTS synthesis. In: J. P. H. van Santen, R. W. Sproat, J. P. Olive, J. Hirschberg (eds), Progress in Speech Synthesis 459-475. New York: Springer (1997).
 Investigating unscripted speech: implications for phonetics and phonology. In: Festschrift for Björn Lindblom. Phonetica 57, 85-94 (2000). 
 Überlänge im Niederdeutschen? In: R. Peters, H. P. Pütz, U. Weber (eds.), Vulpis Adolatio. Festschrift für Hubertus Menke zum 60. Geburtstag, 385-402. Heidelberg: C. Winter (2001). 
 Articulatory dynamics of vowels and consonants in speech communication. Journal of the International Phonetic Association 31, 1-16 (2001). 
 Plosive-related glottalization phenomena in read and spontaneous speech. A stød in German? In: N. Grønnum and J. Rischel (eds), To Honour Eli Fischer-Jørgensen. Travaux du Cercle Linguistique de Copenhague, vol. 31, 174-211. Copenhagen: Reitzel (2001). (Lautmuster deutscher Spontansprache 2.(a))
 (ed.) Progress in Experimental Phonology. From Communicative Function to Phonetic Substance and Vice Versa. Phonetica 62 (2005).

References

External links 
 personal Homepage at Kiel University

Phoneticians
Phonologists
Linguists from Germany
1935 births
Living people